This is a list of Ministers of Planning of Brazil.

Fourth Brazilian Republic

Military Dictatorship (Fifth Brazilian Republic)

Sixth Brazilian Republic

References 

Planning